Howard Springs may refer to any of the following places:

Australia
Howard Springs, Northern Territory, a locality near Darwin, housing a quarantine facility
Howard Springs Hunting Reserve, a protected area in the Northern Territory
Howard Springs Nature Park, a protected area in the Northern Territory

United States
Howard Springs, California
Howard Springs (Crockett County, Texas)

See also
Howard (disambiguation)